Antifaz is the first album by beauty queen turned actress and singer Dayanara Torres. The album was produced by Arturo Diaz and Don Stockwell under Tropix Music and distributed by Sony BMG. The first single was "Antifaz" which received huge airplay in Latin America and in the Philippines though it did not match the success of the last single "Jerigonza" with Ivy Queen which peaked at #17, #6 and #5 on the Billboard Hot Latin Songs, Latin Tropical Airplay and Latin Pop Airplay charts, respectively.

Track listing
"And If Someday You Return"   – 3:57 (James Stevens-Arce)
"Blue Shades"  – 4:13 (Idalet Burgos)
"Antifaz"  – 4:13 (Idalet Burgos)
"Volver A Volar"  – 3:46 (Eduardo Reyes, Alejandro Montalbán)
"Magia"  – 3:46 (featuring Stalin) (The Wizard)
"Luces De Neon"  – 3:23 (Eduardo Reyes, Alejandro Montalbán)
"Mirame Bailando"  – 3:30 (Eduardo Reyes)
"Mas Si Regresas"  – 3:57 (James Stevens-Arce)
"Pidelo De Corazon"  – 4:09 (Omar Alfanno)
"Fuego De Pasion"  – 3:55 (Ruco Gandía)
"Jerigonza"  – 3:57 (featuring Ivy Queen) (Dayanara Torres, María D'Lourdes, Eduardo Reyes)
"Disparame Tu Amor"  – 3:55 (The Wizard)
"Amarilli Mia Bella"  – 3:10 (Giulio Caccini)

Bonus tracks
<li>"Antifaz Blue Eyes Remix"  – 6:31 (Idalet Burgos)
<li>"Antifaz New York Club Remix"  – 5:46 (Idalet Burgos)

Personnel
Vocal: Dayanara Torres
Featuring: Ivy Queen, Stalin
Trumpet: Gustavo López
Trombone: Gamalier González
Guitars: David Canals and Eduardo Reyes
Background Singers: María D'Lourdes, David Canals, Marissa Alemán, Laura Reyes, Claudia Heredia, Miguel Omar Reyes and Julie Ann del Río

Production
Musical Production, Arranger and Programmer: Eduardo Reyes
Additional Production: DJ Sugar Kid
Special Collaboration: Gilberto Luciano
Executive Producers: Arturo F. Díaz and Don Stockwell
Graphics Design: Yania Olabarrieta
Photographer: Eduardo Pérez
Manager: Heather Rasch
Management: Ooh La La Entertainment

References

1998 debut albums